In differential geometry and mathematical physics, an Einstein manifold is a Riemannian or pseudo-Riemannian differentiable manifold whose Ricci tensor is proportional to the metric. They are named after Albert Einstein because this condition is equivalent to saying that the metric is a solution of the vacuum Einstein field equations (with cosmological constant), although both the dimension and the signature of the metric can be arbitrary, thus not being restricted to Lorentzian manifolds (including the four-dimensional Lorentzian manifolds usually studied in general relativity). Einstein manifolds in four Euclidean dimensions are studied as gravitational instantons.

If M is the underlying n-dimensional manifold, and g is its metric tensor, the Einstein condition means that

for some constant k, where Ric denotes the Ricci tensor of g.

The Einstein condition and Einstein's equation

In local coordinates the condition that  be an Einstein manifold is simply

Taking the trace of both sides reveals that the constant of proportionality k for Einstein manifolds is related to the scalar curvature R by

where n is the dimension of M.

In general relativity, Einstein's equation with a cosmological constant Λ is

where  is the Einstein gravitational constant. The stress–energy tensor Tab gives the matter and energy content of the underlying spacetime. In vacuum (a region of spacetime devoid of matter) , and Einstein's equation can be rewritten in the form (assuming that ):

Therefore, vacuum solutions of Einstein's equation are (Lorentzian) Einstein manifolds with k proportional to the cosmological constant.

Examples 

Simple examples of Einstein manifolds include:

Any manifold with constant sectional curvature is an Einstein manifold—in particular:
 Euclidean space, which is flat, is a simple example of Ricci-flat, hence Einstein metric.
 Complex projective space, with the Fubini–Study metric, have 
 Calabi–Yau manifolds admit an Einstein metric that is also Kähler, with Einstein constant . Such metrics are not unique, but rather come in families; there is a Calabi–Yau metric in every Kähler class, and the metric also depends on the choice of complex structure. For example, there is a 60-parameter family of such metrics on K3, 57 parameters of which give rise to Einstein metrics which are not related by isometries or rescalings.
 Kähler–Einstein metrics exist on a variety of compact complex manifolds due to the existence results of Shing-Tung Yau, and the later study of K-stability especially in the case of Fano manifolds. 

A necessary condition for closed, oriented, 4-manifolds to be Einstein is satisfying the Hitchin–Thorpe inequality.

Applications

Four dimensional Riemannian Einstein manifolds are also important in mathematical physics as gravitational instantons in quantum theories of gravity. The term "gravitational instanton" is usually used restricted to Einstein 4-manifolds whose Weyl tensor is self-dual, and it is usually assumed that the metric is asymptotic to the standard metric of Euclidean 4-space (and are therefore complete but non-compact). In differential geometry, self-dual Einstein 4-manifolds are also known as (4-dimensional) hyperkähler manifolds in the Ricci-flat case, and quaternion Kähler manifolds otherwise.

Higher-dimensional Lorentzian Einstein manifolds are used in modern theories of gravity, such as string theory, M-theory and supergravity. Hyperkähler and quaternion Kähler manifolds (which are special kinds of Einstein manifolds) also have applications in physics as target spaces for nonlinear σ-models with supersymmetry.

Compact Einstein manifolds have been much studied in differential geometry, and many examples are known, although constructing them is often challenging. Compact Ricci-flat manifolds are particularly difficult to find: in the monograph on the subject by the pseudonymous author Arthur Besse, readers are offered a meal in a starred restaurant in exchange for a new example.

See also

Einstein–Hermitian vector bundle

Notes and references 

Riemannian manifolds
Manifold
Mathematical physics